Anisolabis is a genus of earwigs in the subfamily Anisolabidinae. It was cited by Srivastava in Part 2 of Fauna of India. The name Anisolabis stems from the asymmetry of the male cerci; the right cercus being more acute than the left.

Species
The genus includes the following species:

 Anisolabis breviforceps
 Anisolabis hawaiiensis
 Anisolabis howarthi
 Anisolabis littorea
 Anisolabis maritima
 Anisolabis mauiensis
 Anisolabis oahuensis
 Anisolabis pacifica
 Anisolabis subarmata
 Anisolabis seirokui

References

External links
 The Earwig Research Centre's Anisolabis database Source for references: type Anisolabis in the "genus" field and click "search".

Insects of Asia
Anisolabididae
Dermaptera genera
Taxa named by Franz Xaver Fieber